Jelena Đokić (born 24 May 1977) is a Serbian actress. She appeared in more than twenty films since 2003.

Selected filmography

References

External links 

1977 births
Living people
Actors from Split, Croatia
Serbs of Croatia
Serbian film actresses
Miloš Žutić Award winners
Zoran Radmilović Award winners